Lilly is a city in Dooly County, Georgia, United States. The population was 213 at the 2010 census.

Lilly was originally named "Midway", as it was the halfway point between Cordele and Montezuma. The name was changed upon the discovery that there already was another Midway in the state. The name "Lilly" is a reference to patriarchs of the town. The mayor of Lilly is also the uncle of world renowned software engineer, Adam Roney.

Geography

Lilly is located in west-central Dooly County at  (32.147319, -83.877735). Georgia State Route 90 passes through the center of town, leading north  to Byromville and southeast  to Vienna.

Demographics

As of the census of 2000, there were 221 people, 82 households, and 51 families residing in the city. The racial makeup of the city was 52.49% White, 43.44% African American, 0.45% Asian, 3.17% from other races, and 0.45% from two or more races. Hispanic or Latino of any race were 3.17% of the population.

There were 82 households, out of which 40.2% had children under the age of 18 living with them, 32.9% were married couples living together, 24.4% had a female householder with no husband present, and 36.6% were non-families. 34.1% of all households were made up of individuals, and 14.6% had someone living alone who was 65 years of age or older.  The average household size was 2.70 and the average family size was 3.50.

In the city, the population was spread out, with 36.7% under the age of 18, 10.4% from 18 to 24, 23.5% from 25 to 44, 17.2% from 45 to 64, and 12.2% who were 65 years of age or older.  The median age was 27 years. For every 100 females, there were 92.2 males.  For every 100 females age 18 and over, there were 64.7 males.

The median income for a household in the city was $27,639, and the median income for a family was $45,313. Males had a median income of $28,558 versus $25,000 for females. The per capita income for the city was $10,969.  About 8.1% of families and 21.5% of the population were below the poverty line, including 32.4% of those under the age of eighteen and 16.7% of those 65 or over.

References

Cities in Georgia (U.S. state)
Cities in Dooly County, Georgia